The fifth USS Independence (CV/CVA-62) was an aircraft carrier of the United States Navy. She entered service in 1959, with much of her early years spent in the Mediterranean Fleet.

Independence was decommissioned in 1998 after 39 years of active service.  Stored in recent years at Puget Sound Naval Shipyard, Bremerton, Washington, the ex-Independence was towed beginning on 10 March 2017 to Brownsville, Texas for scrapping. She arrived on 1 June 2017 and dismantling was completed by early 2019.

Design and construction

The s were designed in the early 1950s as a smaller version of the cancelled United States-class "supercarriers". Unlike the United States class, they were to operate in both the nuclear strike and conventional roles, and were therefore intended to carry a mixed fleet of fighters, light attack and heavy attack aircraft, all of which were to be jets. The carriers were designed around the large new Douglas A3D Skywarrior bomber, with four deck-edge aircraft elevators large enough to handle the new bomber.

Independence was built with an angled flight deck with four C-7 steam catapults, two on the bow and two on the angled deck. She was fitted with AN/SPS-37 long-range search radar and AN/SPS-8B height finding radar. Defensive armament consisted of eight 5"/54 caliber Mark 42 guns mounted on sponsons jutting out from the sides of the ship so they did not interfere with the flight deck. The initial air wing of the Forrestal-class carriers was about 90 aircraft, although this varied with the composition of the airwing.

The contract to build Independence, the fourth Forrestal-class carrier was awarded to the Brooklyn Navy Yard on 2 July 1954, with the ship being laid down on 1 July 1955. She was launched on 6 June 1958 by the wife of Thomas S. Gates, the Secretary of the Navy, and commissioned on 10 January 1959.

Operational history

Testing and workup
Independence conducted shakedown training under her first captain, Captain R. Y. McElroy, with the first landing-on being carried out by a Grumman Trader carrier onboard delivery aircraft on 2 March 1959. She arrived at her new homeport of Naval Station Norfolk, Virginia on 30 June 1959, and then carried out a ten-week training cruise in the Caribbean. During these trials, while carrying out compatibility tests aboard the new carrier, a Douglas A3D Skywarrior was catapulted off Independence at a gross weight of 84,000 pounds (38,000 kg), the heaviest aircraft to take off from a carrier at the time.

1960–1964

Independence operated off the Virginia Capes for the next year on training maneuvers, and departed 4 August 1960 for her first cruise to the Mediterranean. There, she added to the power of the 6th Fleet in the region, remaining in the eastern Mediterranean until her return to Norfolk 3 March 1961. On 4 August 1961, she departed again for the Mediterranean to join the US 6th fleet for another cruise and returned on 19 December 1961 to Norfolk.

Independence sailed on 19 April 1962 for Sixth Fleet duty in support of President John F. Kennedy's firm stand on Berlin during a recurrence of stress in a critical area. She returned to Norfolk 27 August and sailed 11 October for the Caribbean Sea. Called on by President Kennedy on 24 October during the 1962 Cuban Missile Crisis, Independence she acted as a key participant in the U.S. naval blockade of Cuba. She arrived off Puerto Rico in response to the presence of Soviet missiles in Cuba and took part in the quarantine operations until the resolution of the crisis. She then returned to Norfolk on 25 November for readiness exercises along the eastern seaboard, overhaul in the Norfolk Naval Shipyard, and refresher training out of Guantanamo Bay.

Independence departed Norfolk on 6 August 1963 to take part in combined readiness exercises in the Bay of Biscay with sea-air units of the United Kingdom and France then entered the Mediterranean on 21 August for further duty with the Sixth Fleet. Cruising throughout the Mediterranean, she gained much valuable experience during combined NATO exercises, including close air support to Turkish paratroops, reconnaissance, communications, and convoy strike support. President Makarios of Cyprus paid her a visit on 7 October 1963, after which she took part in bilateral U.S.-Italian exercises in the Adriatic with Italian patrol torpedo boats, and U.S.-French exercises, which pitted her aircraft against French interceptors and a surface action with the French cruiser . She returned to Norfolk on 4 March 1964.

Following training exercises, ranging north to New York and south to Naval Station Mayport, Florida, Independence departed Norfolk 8 September 1964 for NATO Teamwork exercises in the Norwegian Sea and off the coast of France, then to Gibraltar. She returned to Norfolk 5 November 1964 and entered the Norfolk Naval Shipyard for overhaul.

1965–1970
On 10 May 1965, Independence deployed for more than seven months, including 100 days in the South China Sea, off the coast of Vietnam, the first Atlantic Fleet carrier to do so. She also was the fifth U.S. carrier to operate off Vietnam. Independence and her embarked Carrier Air Wing 7 received the Navy Unit Commendation for exceptionally meritorious service from 5 June to 21 November 1965. The carrier's air group participated in the first major series of coordinated strikes against vital enemy supply lines north of the Hanoi-Haiphong complex, successfully evading the first massive surface-to-air missile barrage in aviation history while attacking assigned targets, and executing, the first successful attack on an enemy surface-to-air missile installation. The carrier launched more than 7,000 sorties, sustaining an exceptional pace of day and night strike operations against military and logistic supply facilities in North Vietnam. "The superior team spirit, courage, professional competence, and devotion to duty displayed by the officers and men of Independence and embarked Attack Carrier Air Wing Seven reflect great credit upon themselves and the United States Naval Service."

Independence returned to her homeport, Norfolk, arriving 13 December 1965. During the first half of 1966, she operated off Norfolk, replenishing and training air groups. On 4 May 1966, she participated in Operation Strikex. The carrier departed Norfolk 13 June for European operations with the Sixth Fleet. Independence was involved with unit and NATO exercises from July into December. She then continued her Sixth Fleet deployment returning to CONUS in early 1967. After a few months of local operations, she underwent an extensive overhaul at the Norfolk Naval Shipyard. 

On 30 April 1968, Independence steamed to the Mediterranean Sea for a nine-month deployment. She returned to Pier 12 NOB Norfolk, Virginia on 27 January 1969. On 3 September 1969, the Independence departed Norfolk to participate in NATO exercises in the North Atlantic, (NORLANT), where she participated in testing the Hawker Siddeley Harrier in flight deck operations, returning home on 9 October 1969. Independence was again deployed to the Mediterranean on 23 June 1970, returning to Pier 12 on 31 January 1971. It was during this cruise that the ship was awarded the Meritorious Unit Commendation in support of actions against the PLO during the Jordanian crisis.

1970–1979

On 25 September 1970, the news was received that Gamal Abdel Nasser, President of the United Arab Republic had died; an event that might plunge the Middle East into a crisis.

Pilots of VMA-142, -131 and -133 began qualification landings in A-4 Skyhawks aboard Independence on 3 August 1971. For the next three days, four active duty and 20 reserve pilots operated aboard the carrier —the first time that Marine Corps Reserve squadrons qualified in carrier duty.
 

Deploying from Norfolk in September 1971, the crew earned the designation as 'Blue Nose' sailors when the Independence crossed the Arctic Circle on 28 September. During subsequent operations in the North Sea, Independence conducted cross-deck operations with the British aircraft carrier  and transited the English Channel en route to the Strait of Gibraltar and scheduled operations in the Mediterranean Sea.

In May 1973, President Richard M. Nixon delivered his annual Armed Forces Day address from the decks of Independence. While based in Norfolk, the ship made deployments to the Mediterranean Sea and Indian Ocean. Independence operated off the island of Crete.

In the summer of 1974, Independence departed Norfolk for yet another 'Med Cruise', operating with CTG 60.1 and CVW-7. Relieving Franklin D. Roosevelt, Independence and Saratoga continued the tradition of steaming the Mediterranean while being shadowed by Soviet aircraft and ships. On 8 September 1974, sailors were introduced to the new concept of terrorism when a bomb exploded in the cargo compartment of TWA Flight 841 high above. Steaming to the crash site, Independence and other ships spent two days retrieving the remains of the ill-fated jetliner, her crew, and passengers.

On 20 June 1979, Lieutenant Donna L. Spruill became the first female Navy pilot to carrier qualify in a fixed-wing aircraft. Lieutenant Spruill piloted a C-1A Trader to an arrested landing aboard Independence.

1980–1989

On 19 November 1980, Independence with Carrier Air Wing Six (AE) embarked, deployed to the Indian Ocean along with the cruiser  and was on watch along with Ranger on "Gonzo Station" as President Reagan took office and the Iranian Hostages were freed. Subsequently, completing an Indian Ocean cruise, Independence transited the Suez Canal northbound, shortly after  had transited southbound, making America the first United States Navy carrier (and, thus, Independence the second) to transit the Suez Canal since  in 1967. Independence completed a deployment of 204 days. Scheduled to go to Singapore, the crew was instead diverted to the Persian Gulf to back up  during the Iran Hostage Crisis mission with Capt. Thomas E. Shanahan Commanding. After the Gulf, Independence and her battle group visited Perth/Fremantle, Western Australia from 2 to 7 February for R&R. Upon completion of the deployment, Captain Shanahan was promoted to rear admiral.

In 1982, Independence provided critical support to the multinational peacekeeping force in Lebanon. After steaming together in the eastern Mediterranean Sea for several days, Forrestal and Independence relieved Dwight D. Eisenhower and John F. Kennedy, the latter sailing home to Norfolk, after a long deployment.

In late October 1983, Independences battle group (Carrier Group Four), assigned to the United States Second Fleet, became the core of Task Group 20.5, the carrier task group that would support the Invasion of Grenada. On 25 October 1983, aircraft from Independence's embarked air wing flew missions supporting the invasion. Returning to Lebanon that same year, the ship's air wing conducted air strikes against Syrian positions.

In 1984, she won the Marjorie Sterrett Battleship Fund Award for the Atlantic Fleet.

On 17 February 1985, Independence arrived at the Philadelphia Naval Shipyard to undergo a modernization and overhaul program to extend her service life by 15 years. The flight deck was improved to allow the recovery of high-performance aircraft while the ship traveled at slower speeds, and the NATO Sea Sparrow launchers were upgraded. Other improvements improved the ship's fuel consumption. Independence completed the Service Life Extension Program (SLEP) at Philadelphia Naval Shipyard in June 1988. Setting sail 15 August 1988 from Norfolk, the ship transited the tip of South America and arrived at her new homeport of NAS North Island, in San Diego, California, 8 October.

The Paramount film Flight of the Intruder (1991), starring Danny Glover, Willem Dafoe, and Brad Johnson was filmed partly on Independence. The aircraft carrier went out for two weeks of filming in November 1989; the on-board fire party was kept busy dealing with the numerous small electrical fires that the movie crew had started with their lighting equipment.

1990–1995

In June 1990, with Carrier Air Wing 14 embarked, Independence departs San Diego on a routine WESTPAC. On 2 August, in response to Iraq's invasion of Kuwait, Independence, leading Task Group 800.1, which included Jouett (CG-29), was sent to deter further Iraqi aggression during Operation Desert Shield. Arriving on station in the Gulf of Oman on 5 August, Independence was the first carrier to enter the Persian Gulf since 1974. The ship remained on station for 112 days and permanently reestablished a U.S. naval presence in the region. She returned to San Diego on 20 December 1990.

Independence changed homeports again on 11 September 1991—this time to Yokosuka, Japan, embarking Carrier Air Wing 5 and becoming the Navy's only permanently forward-deployed aircraft carrier, and flagship for Commander, Carrier Group Five.

On 23 August 1992, Independence entered the Persian Gulf, under the Command of Captain Carter B. Refo prepared to enforce an Allied ban on Iraqi flights over south Iraq below the 32nd parallel north. On 26 August, President George H. W. Bush announced that the United States and its allies had informed Iraq that in 24 hours allied aircraft would fly surveillance missions in southern Iraq and were prepared to shoot down any Iraqi aircraft flying south of the 32nd parallel. The action was precipitated by Iraq's failure to comply with U.N. Resolution 688, which demanded that the Iraqi government stop the repression of its Shiite population in southern Iraq.

Persian Gulf allies began to enforce the ban on Iraqi planes from flying south of the 32nd parallel on 27 August in Operation Southern Watch. Any Iraqi planes that violated the ban would be shot down. Twenty Navy aircraft from CVW-5 aboard Independence in the Persian Gulf were the first coalition aircraft on station over Iraq as Operation Southern Watch began. Southern Watch was the enforcement of a ban on Iraqi warplanes and helicopters from flying south of the 32nd parallel.

Independence became the most battle experienced ship in the Navy's active fleet, and the first carrier in history to hold that distinction, on 30 June 1995. With this honor, Independence displayed the Revolution-era First Navy Jack, commonly called the "Don't Tread on Me" flag, from her bow until her decommissioning. The flag was presented to Independences commanding officer Capt. David P. Polatty III in a formal ceremony on 1 July. The flag was received from  upon her decommissioning.

In November 1995, Independence and Carrier Air Wing Five returned to Japan after successfully completing their third deployment to the Persian Gulf in support of Operation Southern Watch.

1996–1998

In March 1996, Independence was deployed to the waters east of Taiwan to provide a stabilizing presence amid the Third Taiwan Strait Crisis. She was joined in the area by Nimitz as the People's Republic of China lobbed missiles into Taiwanese territorial waters. On returning to Yokosuka in April 1996, the ship was visited by President Bill Clinton as part of an official state visit to Japan.

In 1997, Independence made a four-month deployment, covering several major exercises and seven ports of call. Included in these ports of call were two historic port visits. The first was 28 February 1997 to the island territory of Guam. Independence was the first aircraft carrier to pull into Guam in 36 years.

The second, two months later, was to Port Klang, Malaysia. Independence became the first aircraft carrier in the world to make a port visit to Malaysia.

Before sailing back to Yokosuka, Japan, Independence made her last port call of the deployment in May 1997 to Hong Kong. The ship's port call was the last U.S. naval visit to the territory before its handover to China on 1 July 1997.

Decommissioning and fate

Independence was decommissioned in ceremonies at the Puget Sound Naval Shipyard in Bremerton, Washington, on 30 September 1998.  At the conclusion of this ceremony, in keeping with naval tradition, Independences last commanding officer, Captain (later Rear Admiral) Mark R. Milliken, USN, was the last person to depart the ship.

Independences commissioning pennant was hauled down 39 years, 9 months and 20 days after it was first hoisted, and the "Don't Tread on Me" First Navy Jack was transferred to the Navy's next oldest active ship, the aircraft carrier Kitty Hawk.

After decommissioning, Independence remained in mothballs for five and a half years before being struck on 8 March 2004. During her time in mothballs, the ship was said to have been heavily stripped to support the active carrier fleet, especially the remaining s. Her port anchor and both anchor chains were used on the new  . The recycling of parts and the poor material condition of the ship at the time she was withdrawn made a strong argument against retaining her as a potential museum ship. In April 2004, Navy officials identified ex-Independence as one of 24 decommissioned ships available to be sunk as artificial reefs. At that time, she was still available for donation as a reef while awaiting a contract for her dismantling to be awarded.

On 26 January 2012, the Navy's Naval Sea Systems Command posted a notice of solicitation for the towing and complete dismantlement of multiple CV-59/CV-63 Class Aircraft Carriers in the United States, including Forrestal, Independence, and Constellation. The impacts of an initial scrapping for marine life in the Puget Sound required remediation with a layer of sand over the scrapping area.

On 26 April 2017, she was on her way through the Strait of Magellan, and on 30 May 2017 she arrived at Brownsville, where a special ceremony was held at Isla Blanca Park for veterans, school children and members of the local community to honour the vessel. Scrapping was completed by early 2019.

Two of the ship's propellers are on display at South Padre Island.

See also
 List of aircraft carriers
 List of aircraft carriers of the United States Navy

References

Bibliography
 
 

 
 
 
 
  It also includes text from

External links

Reunion groups:
ussindependence.us: CVA/CV-62 Communications Department
ussindependencecv-62.org: USS INDEPENDENCE CV-62 Assoc. Inc

Forrestal-class aircraft carriers
Ships built in Brooklyn
1958 ships
Cold War aircraft carriers of the United States
Vietnam War aircraft carriers of the United States